V. Muthiah Panchalingam ( – 1 May 1989) was a Sri Lankan civil servant. He was assassinated by the rebel Liberation Tigers of Tamil Eelam.

Early life
Panchalingam was the son of Muthiah, a businessman from Kandy in central Ceylon. He was educated at Jaffna Hindu College and Ananda College. After school he joined the University of Ceylon, graduating with an honours BSc degree in chemistry.

Career
After university Panchalingam worked as a research officer in the Rubber Research Institute before joining the Ceylon Civil Service in 1957 a District Land Officer. He served in Mannar, Kandy and Vavuniya. He was later Assistant Government Agent and Additional Government Agent (1979) in Jaffna. He became District Secretary for Jaffna District in 1984.

Death
Panchalingam was shot dead on 1 May 1989 at his brother's house in Nallur. A youth with an AK-47 rifle had fired 23 bullets into Panchalingam's body, eight into his head. The rebel Liberation Tigers of Tamil Eelam claimed responsibility for Panchalingam's killing.

References

1989 deaths
Alumni of Ananda College
Alumni of Jaffna Hindu College
Alumni of the University of Ceylon
Government Agents (Sri Lanka)
Assassinated Sri Lankan people
People from Northern Province, Sri Lanka
People killed during the Sri Lankan Civil War
Sri Lankan Tamil civil servants
Year of birth uncertain
1930 births